Thomas Higginson may refer to:
Thomas Wentworth Higginson (1823–1911), American author, abolitionist, and soldier
Thomas Higginson (Canadian politician) (1810–1896), Canadian political figure
Thomas Higginson (soldier) (1794–1884), Canadian soldier, civic official and politician
Tom Higgenson of the band Plain White Ts